Sapyornoye is a rural locality (a logging depot settlement) in Priozersky District of Leningrad Oblast, located on the Karelian Isthmus. Population: 3,647 (2010 Census); 3,297 (2002 Census).

References

Rural localities in Leningrad Oblast
Karelian Isthmus